The Blonde from Singapore (also released as Hot Pearls) is a 1941 American adventure film directed by Edward Dmytryk and starring Florence Rice.

Cast
 Florence Rice as Mary Brooks
 Leif Erickson as Terry Prescott
 Gordon Jones as 'Waffles' Billings
 Don Beddoe as Sgt. Burns
 Alexander D'Arcy as Prince Sali
 Adele Rowland as Sultana
 Lumsden Hare as Reginald Belvin
 Richard Terry as Tada
 Emory Parnell as Capt. Nelson
 Uncredited actors include Filipino Hollywood actor Rudy Robles as the servant.

References

External links
 

1941 films
1941 adventure films
American black-and-white films
Films directed by Edward Dmytryk
American adventure films
Columbia Pictures films
1940s English-language films
1940s American films